Comhaltas Ceoltóirí Éireann (meaning "Society of the musicians of Ireland") is the primary Irish organisation dedicated to the promotion of the music, song, dance and the language of Ireland. The organisation was founded in 1951 and has promoted Irish music and culture among the Irish people and the Irish diaspora.

Its current Director General is Senator Labhrás Ó Murchú. Today it has more than 400 branches worldwide, in Ireland, the United Kingdom, the United States of America, Canada, Mexico, France, Spain, Germany, Hungary, Luxembourg, Russia, Australia and New Zealand.

History
Comhaltas was founded in 1951 in Mullingar, County Westmeath by a group of traditional pipers who felt that the Irish musical tradition was in decline; it was initially named Cumann Ceoltóirí na hÉireann, changing to its present name in 1952.

Centres

Áras an Mhuilinn, Mullingar.
Brú Ború, Cashel.
Brú na Sí, Youghal.
Clasaċ, Clontarf.
Cnoc na Gaoithe, Tulla.
Cois na hAbhna, Ennis.
Cultúrlann na hÉireann, Headquarters, Monkstown.
Dún Uladh, Omagh.
Dún na Sí, Moate.
Kilrush Regional Outreach Centre.
Meitheal an Íarthar/Ceoláras Coleman/Regional Resource Centre, Gurteen.
Morrison Teach Cheoil, Riverstown.
Oriel Centre (Dundalk Gaol).

Activities

Comhaltas is responsible for organising the annual national Irish music festival and competition called the Fleadh Cheoil.

Comhaltas has published a magazine called Treoir relating to Irish traditional music since 1970.

See also
Music of Ireland
Uilleann pipes
Irish language
Fleadh Cheoil

References

External links

Music organisations based in the Republic of Ireland
1951 establishments in Ireland
Folk music organizations
Irish-language education
Musical groups established in 1951
Seanad nominating bodies